Syomkin or Semkin is a Russian masculine surname, its feminine counterpart is Syomkina or Semkina. It may refer to
Anatoli Syomkin (born 1992), Russian football player
Olga Semkina (born 1976), Russian figure skater

Russian-language surnames